KSWI (95.7 FM, "KS 95.7") is a radio station licensed to serve Atlantic, Iowa. The station is owned by Meredith Communications, LLC. It airs a classic hits music format.

The station was assigned the KSWI callsign by the Federal Communications Commission on April 17, 2000.

References

External links
Official website

SWI
Classic hits radio stations in the United States
Radio stations established in 2000
Cass County, Iowa
2000 establishments in the United States